Mai-Ndombe may refer to:

Mai-Ndombe District, a former district of Bandundu Province in the Democratic Republic of the Congo
Mai-Ndombe Province, a province in the Democratic Republic of the Congo
Lake Mai-Ndombe, a lake in Mai-Ndombe Province in the Democratic Republic of the Congo